Kfar Chellal is a village located in the Sidon District of the South Governorate in Lebanon.

References

Populated places in Sidon District